Mvita Constituency is an electoral constituency in Kenya. It is one of six constituencies in Mombasa County.  The entire constituency is located within Mombasa municipality area. The constituency was established for the 1988 elections.

Members of Parliament

Locations and wards

See also
Historic Swahili Settlements
Swahili architecture

References

External links 
Map of the constituency

Swahili people
Swahili city-states
Swahili culture
Constituencies in Mombasa County
Constituencies in Coast Province
1988 establishments in Kenya
Constituencies established in 1988